Emma Söderberg (born 18 February 1998) is a Swedish ice hockey goaltender and member of the Swedish national ice hockey team, currently playing with the Minnesota Duluth Bulldogs women's ice hockey program in the Western Collegiate Hockey Association (WCHA) conference of the NCAA Division I.

Early life 
Söderberg was born on 18 February 1998 in Örnsköldsvik, Sweden, to Ove and Karin Söderberg. As an adolescent, she was a goaltender for Modo Hockey Dam of the Swedish Women's Hockey League (SDHL), where she had a 1.55 goals against average (GAA) and .940 save percentage in 19 games.

College career 
Söderberg joined the Minnesota Duluth Bulldogs women's ice hockey team for the 2018–19 season. She played in five games during her freshman year, posting a win–loss-overtime record of 3–1–0 and stopped 94 out of 103 shots for a .913 save percentage and 2.09 GAA. As a junior during the 2020–21 season, Söderberg's .951 save percentage, 1.34 GAA, and five shutout games were all within the top three of all NCAA women's ice hockey, and she received both the Western Collegiate Hockey Association (WCHA) Goaltending Champion statistical title and the Goaltender of the Year award. It was the first time that Minnesota Duluth had won the WCHA Goaltender of the Year title. That year, Minnesota Duluth reached the Frozen Four semifinal round of the 2021 NCAA National Collegiate Women's Ice Hockey Tournament, where they fell to Northwestern 3–2 in overtime. Söderberg made 44 saves during the match before allowing the game-winning goal on a shot from Northeastern skater Skylar Fontaine.

At the time that her 2021–22 season was interrupted due to the 2022 Winter Olympics, Söderberg was second in the WCHA with 13 wins, four shutouts, and a .920 save percentage.

International play 
After helping the Sweden women's national ice hockey team during their qualification rounds, Söderberg was selected to goaltend for the team at the 2022 Winter Olympics in Beijing.

References

External links 
 
 UMD Bulldogs profile

Living people
1998 births
Swedish women's ice hockey goaltenders
Olympic ice hockey players of Sweden
Ice hockey players at the 2022 Winter Olympics
Minnesota Duluth Bulldogs women's ice hockey players
People from Örnsköldsvik Municipality
Sportspeople from Västernorrland County